This is a list of Chinese painters:

See also

 List of Chinese artists
 Chinese calligraphy
 Chinese painting
 List of calligraphers

 Lists of painters

External link

 
Painters
Chinese